Pender Island  is one of the Southern Gulf Islands located in the Gulf of Georgia, British Columbia, Canada. Like most of the rest of the Southern Gulf Islands, Pender Island enjoys a sub-Mediterranean climate and features open farmland, rolling forested hills, several lakes and small mountains, as well as many coves and beaches.

Geography
Pender Island consists of two islands, North Pender and South Pender, which are separated by a narrow canal originally dredged in 1903. In 1955 the islands were connected by a one lane bridge, as it remains today.

Most of the population and services reside on North Pender Island, with the highest concentration surrounding the upper class Magic Lake.

History

At the time of European Contact, Pender Island was inhabited by Coast Salish peoples speaking the North Straits Salish language. There is an Indian reserve at Hay Point on South Pender Island, which is home to members of the Tsawout and Tseycum First Nations. Carbon dating of artifacts in shell middens near Shark Cove identify an Indigenous village site that has been more or less continuously inhabited for five millennia.  The Poets Cove Resort was built on an ancient First Nations village site. The provincial government's 2007 settlement with the Tsawwassen First Nation included hunting and fishing rights on and around Pender Island—an arrangement to which the Sencot'en Alliance objected, saying those rights are theirs under the 1852 Douglas Treaty.

Sencot'en placenames on Pender Island (st̕ey̕əs) include ʔiləčən (Bedwell Harbor), and x̣ʷəl̕isən̕ (Port Browning).

On North Pender Island: šxʷsəɬqʷsət (Shark Cove), x̣ʷəx̣ʷiʔéčsəŋ (Shingle Bay), kʷeqsən (Stanley Point), kʷeqsən (Boat Nook), təlasəŋ̕ (Hope Bay), sq̕ʷəq̕ʷiŋ̕əs (Oaks Bluff), q̕eʔƛ̕əŋ or sq̕eʔəƛ̕əm (Otter Bay), and x̣ʷiʔx̣ʷnəčénəm or sx̣ʷix̣ʷθəʔ (Wallace Point).

On South Pender Island: sk̕ʷən̕enxʷ (Gowlland Point), st'eyus (Bedwell Harbour), and smanəč (Teece Point).

A Spanish expedition led by Francisco de Eliza visited Pender in 1791, naming it "Ysla de San Eusevio". The first permanent resident of European descent arrived on South Pender Island in 1886.

In 1903, residents of Pender Island petitioned the government to dredge the isthmus between what is now North and South Pender Islands.

Culture
Pender Island is a popular destination for fishing, boating, scuba diving and other outdoor pursuits. The island also boasts a 9-hole golf course. In 1937 several Pender residents put up money to purchase a  parcel, on which to develop the course, from George Grimmer, a son of Pender pioneer Washington Grimmer. These first individuals and many others took out memberships as well as planned and developed the layout of the golf course. Incorporated as a society in 1945, with the exception of a brief hiatus during World War II, Pender Island Golf Course has existed ever since. There is also a 27-hole Disc Golf course (Golf Island Disc Park) close to Magic Lake. This course is well known in the Disc Golf community and is the site of many tournaments including The Republic of Pender Invitational (The Ropi) and the Pender Island Invitational.

The Pender Post and the Island Tides are locally published independent newspapers. The Pender Islands Handbook is the island's main 400p reference book and travel guide with hiking, boating, biking, history, etc and a map atlas.

Pender Island is home to Canada's first olive grove, Waterlea Farm. Owner Andrew Butt tends 100 olive trees in hopes to produce the first made-in-Canada olive oil.

Parks and beaches
 Gulf Islands National Park Reserve has opportunities for boating, kayaking, hiking, camping and wildlife viewing. A difficult  trail at Beaumont leads from the Ainslie Point parking lot to the shoreline via steep switchbacks that cut through dense temperate rainforest. The difficult   trail at Mt. Norman ascends   to a panoramic look-out with views of the San Juan Islands. The moderate   trail at Roe Lake meanders through the Shingle Bay uplands to one of the Southern Gulf Island's few freshwater lakes. At Roesland, visitors can explore a historic 1908 farmhouse which has been restored by members of the Pender Islands Museum Society.

Camping
 Gulf Islands National Park Reserve has two options for campers on North Pender at this time: The drive-in, frontcountry sites at Prior Centennial Campground or the walk-in (or kayak-in) backcountry sites at Shingle Bay. Prior Centennial has 17 reservable sites and amenities include potable water, pit toilets, picnic tables and fire pits (seasonally available). Shingle Bay campground in the Roe Lake portion of the Reserve has 10 reservable primitive campsites with picnic tables and a pit toilet but no potable water. The walk/boat in sites at Beaumont on South Pender are closed for overnight camping until further notice as of summer 2022. Beaumont has 11 sites, and amenities include pit toilets and 15 mooring buoys for boaters, which remain open. There is no potable water at Beaumont and no campfires are permitted, regardless of season. 
 Private camping is available at Port Browning Marina. The sites are drive-in and frontcountry. Tents can be pitched anywhere on the large waterfront lawn of the marina. Small RV's are also welcome but there are no hookups or dump station.

Transport

Pender Island can be accessed by regular ferry service provided by BC Ferries from Swartz Bay (near Victoria), Tsawwassen (near Vancouver), and other southern Gulf Islands. There are also scheduled seaplane and water taxi services. There is also a system of "car stops," Pender Island's official alternative to hitch hiking. Conveniently located around the island you will find posts with maps, and often a handy chair.  Pender Island also has a helicopter pad located near the main shopping mall, the Driftwood Centre. Select helicopters can also land at Fire Hall #1. Bedwell Harbour is an official port of entry for sailors from the United States; Port Browning and Otter Bay also offer anchorages.

See also
 Juan Carrasco
 Pender Island Invitational
 Olive production in Canada

References

External links

 Pender Island Chamber of Commerce
 Southern Gulf Islands
 

 Gulf Islands National Park Reserve
 Moving Around Pender alternative transportation society, abbreviated MAP
 Pender Islands Conservancy Association
 Pender Islands Museum Society
 Active Pass Courier & Freight

Populated places in the Capital Regional District
Islands of the Gulf Islands